Ormosia is a genus of legumes (family Fabaceae). The more than 100 living species, mostly trees or large shrubs, are distributed throughout the tropical regions of the world, some extending into temperate zones, especially in East Asia. A few species are threatened by habitat destruction, while the Hainan ormosia (Ormosia howii) is probably extinct already.

Plants in this genus are commonly known as horse-eye beans or simply ormosias, and in Spanish by the somewhat ambiguous term "chocho". The scientific name Ormosia is a nomen conservandum, overruling Toulichiba which is formally rejected under the International Code of Nomenclature for algae, fungi, and plants.

The seeds of these plants are poisonous if eaten, but often look pretty, with bright colors and decorative patterns reminiscent of an eye; the common name "horse-eye beans" refers to these seeds. They resemble the seeds of Abrus, snoutbeans (Rhynchosia), and Adenanthera, but are much larger than the former two. In particular those of Ormosia coccinea are often used for jewelry and other decorative purposes, or as good luck charms. The seeds float and are occasionally found as "sea beans".

Otherwise, Ormosia wood is used as timber or firewood. Some species, for example Ormosia nobilis, are also used in folk medicine.

Fossil record
8 dehiscent seed pod fossils of one Ormosia species from the middle Eocene epoch have been examined from Warman clay pit in Weakley County, while 52 fossil leaflets of two Ormosia species have been described from Warman, New Lawrence and Lamkin clay pits in Weakley and Henry Counties, Tennessee, United States.

Species
Ormosia comprises the following species:

 Ormosia altimontana Meireles & H.C. Lima
 Ormosia amazonica Ducke
 Ormosia antioquensis Rudd
 Ormosia apiculata L. Chen

 Ormosia arborea (Vell.) Harms
 Ormosia assamica Yakovlev
 Ormosia avilensis Pittier
 Ormosia bahiensis Monach.
 Ormosia balansae Drake
 Ormosia bancana (Miq.) Merr.

 Ormosia bolivarensis (Rudd) C.H. Stirt.
 Ormosia boluoensis Y.Q. Wang & P.Y. Chen
 Ormosia bopiensis J.F. Macbr.
 Ormosia calavensis Blanco
 Ormosia cambodiana Gagnep.

 Ormosia chevalieri Niyomdham

 Ormosia cinerea Benoist

 Ormosia coarctata Jacks.
 Ormosia coccinea (Aubl.) Jacks.
 var. coccinea (Aubl.) Jacks.
 var. subsimplex (Benth.) Rudd
 Ormosia colombiana Rudd
 Ormosia costulata (Miq.) Kleinhoonte
 Ormosia coutinhoi Ducke—red horse-eye bean

 Ormosia crassivalvis Gagnep.
 Ormosia cruenta Rudd
 Ormosia cuatrecasasii Rudd

 Ormosia discolor Benth.
 Ormosia elata Rudd
 Ormosia elliptica Q.W. Yao & R.H. Chang

 Ormosia emarginata (Hook. & Arn.) Benth.

 Ormosia eugeniifolia R.H. Chang

 Ormosia excelsa Benth.

 Ormosia fastigiata Tul.
 Ormosia ferruginea R.H. Chang
 Ormosia flava (Ducke) Rudd
 Ormosia fordiana Oliv.
 Ormosia formosana Kaneh.
 Ormosia friburgensis Glaz.
 Ormosia froesii Rudd

 Ormosia glaberrima Y.C. Wu

 Ormosia glauca Wall.

 Ormosia gracilis Prain
 Ormosia grandiflora (Tul.) Rudd

 Ormosia grandistipulata Whitmore
 Ormosia grossa Rudd

 Ormosia hekouensis R.H. Chang
 Ormosia hengchuniana T.C. Huang, S.F. Huang & K.C. Yang
 Ormosia henryi Prain

 Ormosia hoaensis Gagnep.
 Ormosia holerythra Ducke
 Ormosia hosiei Hemsl. & E.H. Wilson
 Ormosia howii L. Chen—Hainan ormosia (probably extinct)

 Ormosia indurata L. Chen
 Ormosia inflata Merr. & L. Chen
 Ormosia intermedia N. Zamora
 Ormosia isthmensis Standl.
 Ormosia jamaicensis Urb.
 Ormosia kerrii Niyomdham
 Ormosia krugii Urb.

 Ormosia laosensis Niyomdham
 Ormosia larecajana Rudd
 Ormosia lewisii D.B.O.S.Cardoso et al.
 Ormosia lignivalvis Rudd
 Ormosia limae D.B.O.S.Cardoso & L.P.Queiroz
 Ormosia longipes L. Chen
 Ormosia macrocalyx Ducke
 Ormosia macrodisca Baker
 Ormosia macrophylla Benth.
 Ormosia maguireorum Rudd
 Ormosia mataridek Aymard & Sanoja
 Ormosia melanocarpa Kleinhoonte

 Ormosia microphylla Merr. & L. Chen

 Ormosia minor Vogel

 Ormosia monosperma (Sw.) Urb.
 Ormosia nanningensis L. Chen
 Ormosia napoensis Z. Wei & R.H. Chang
 Ormosia nitida Vogel
 Ormosia nobilis Tul.
 var. nobilis Tul.
 var. santaremnensis (Ducke) Rudd
 Ormosia nuda (F.C. How) R.H. Chang & Q.W. Yao
 Ormosia oaxacana Rudd

 Ormosia olivacea L. Chen

 Ormosia ormondii (F. Muell.) Merr.
 Ormosia pachycarpa Benth.—Hairy-fruited Ormosia
 Ormosia pachyptera L. Chen

 Ormosia panamensis Benth.—coronil, sur espino
 Ormosia paniculata Merr.
 Ormosia paraensis Ducke

 Ormosia penangensis Ridl.
 Ormosia peruviana Rudd
 Ormosia pingbianensis W.C. Cheng & R.H. Chang
 Ormosia pinnata (Lour.) Merr.
 Ormosia poilanei Niyomdham
 Ormosia polita Prain

 Ormosia pubescens R.H. Chang
 Ormosia purpureiflora L. Chen
 Ormosia revoluta Rudd
 Ormosia robusta Baker
 Ormosia ruddiana Yakovlev

 Ormosia saxatilis K.M. Lan
 Ormosia scandens Prain
 Ormosia schippii Standl. & Steyerm.
 Ormosia schunkei Rudd
 Ormosia semicastrata Hance
 f. litchifolia F. C. How
 f. pallida F. C. How
 f. semicastrata Hance

 Ormosia sericeolucida L. Chen
 Ormosia simplicifolia Merr. & L. Chen
 Ormosia smithii Rudd
 Ormosia solimoesensis Rudd
 Ormosia steyermarkii Rudd

 Ormosia stipulacea Meeuwen
 Ormosia stipularis Ducke
 Ormosia striata Dunn

 Ormosia sumatrana (Miq.) Prain
 Ormosia surigaensis Merr.

 Ormosia tavoyana Prain
 Ormosia timboënsis D. Cardoso, Meireles & H.C. Lima

 Ormosia tonkinensis Gagnep.
 Ormosia tovarensis Pittier
 Ormosia travancorica Bedd.
 Ormosia trifoliolata Huber
 Ormosia tsangii L. Chen
 Ormosia velutina Rudd
 Ormosia venezolana Rudd
 Ormosia venosa Baker
 Ormosia vicosana Rudd

 Ormosia williamsii Rudd

 Ormosia xylocarpa Merr. & L. Chen

 Ormosia zahnii Harms

Species names with uncertain taxonomic status
The status of the following species is unresolved:

 Ormosia apiculata H.Y. Chen
 Ormosia carinata N.Zamora
 Ormosia clementis Merr.
 Ormosia dubia Prain
 Ormosia esquirolii H.Lév.
 Ormosia floribunda Wall.
 Ormosia friburgensis Taub. ex Harms
 Ormosia galericulata C.H. Stirt.
 Ormosia howii Merr. & Chun
 Ormosia indurata H.Y. Chen
 Ormosia inflata Merr. & Chun
 Ormosia longipes H.Y. Chen
 Ormosia microphylla Merr.
 Ormosia monophylla (Harms) Stapf
 Ormosia nanningensis H.Y. Chen
 Ormosia olivacea H.Y. Chen
 Ormosia pachyptera H.Y. Chen
 Ormosia panamensis Benth. ex Seem.
 Ormosia pingbianensis M. Cheng & R.H. Chang
 Ormosia purpureiflora H.Y. Chen
 Ormosia ridleyi King
 Ormosia sericeolucida H.Y. Chen
 Ormosia simplicifolia Merr. & Chun
 Ormosia vagraja C.H. Stirt.
 Ormosia xylocarpa Chun ex Merr. & H.Y. Chen
 Placolobium ellipticum N.D. Khoi & Yakovlev
 Placolobium vietnamense N.D. Khoi & Yakovlev
 Placolobium watsonii (C. Fischer) Yakovlev

References

 
Fabaceae genera
Taxonomy articles created by Polbot